The San Francisco Evening Bulletin was a newspaper in San Francisco, founded as the Daily Evening Bulletin in 1855 by James King of William. King used the newspaper to crusade against political corruption, and built it into having the highest circulation in the city.
He died a year after its founding, assassinated by rival newspaperman and local politician James P. Casey, whom King had exposed as an ex-felon.

William Chauncey Bartlett and Samuel Williams were among its editors, with Williams "responsible for dramatic criticism and book reviews". Fremont Older became editor-in-chief in 1895, at a time when the newspaper had diminished in influence, and he built it up by again attacking corruption. He was forced to step down in 1918, and in 1929 the newspaper was bought by William Randolph Hearst, who merged it with The San Francisco Call.

References

Daily newspapers published in the San Francisco Bay Area
History of the American West
History of California
Defunct newspapers published in California
1855 establishments in California
1929 disestablishments in California